Awareness is an album by American saxophonist Buddy Terry recorded in 1971 and released on the Mainstream label.

Reception

The Allmusic review by Jason Ankeny awarded the album 4 stars stating "Terry moves from soprano to tenor to flute and back again, exemplifying the soul-searching restlessness of his music--at the same time, the individual players fuse seamlessly, channeling the righteous fury of Terry's vision to create a coherent, deeply righteous whole".

Track listing
All compositions by Buddy Terry except as indicated
 "Awareness (Suite)" - 10:49
 "Omnipotence" 	
 "Babylon"
 "Unity"
 "Humility (Trio for Two Bassists and Tenor)"
 "Kamili" (Mtumé) - 8:00
 "Stealin' Gold" (Stanley Cowell) - 7:04
 "Sodom and Gomorrah" - 12:06
 "Abscretions" (Cowell) - 4:49

Personnel
Buddy Terry - tenor saxophone, soprano saxophone, flute, percussion
Cecil Bridgewater - trumpet, percussion
Roland Prince - electric guitar
Stanley Cowell - piano, electric piano
Buster Williams - bass, electric bass
Victor Gaskin - bass, electric bass, percussion
Mickey Roker - drums
Mtumé - congas

References

Mainstream Records albums
Buddy Terry albums
1971 albums
Albums produced by Bob Shad